The Stony Creek Puppet House was a theater in the Stony Creek section of Branford, Connecticut, near New Haven and the famed Thimble Islands. Built in 1903 as a movie theater, it became the home for community theater and summer stock productions. Orson Welles staged his short-lived stage production, Too Much Johnson, at The Stony Creek Theatre in 1938. After operating as a parachute factory during World War II, it became a puppet theater. The building is a Connecticut Historical Landmark that has been renovated as a live theater venue, the Legacy Theatre, which held its grand opening on April 23, 2021.

History
 
The Stony Creek Puppet House was originally built in 1903 as a silent movie house called The Lyric Theater. In 1920, a Stony Creek community theater group called the Parish Players purchased the building and opened it as The Stony Creek Theater. It was then home to the famous Parish Players, who, in collaboration with Lee Shubert, presented the pre-Broadway production of Death Takes a Holiday  in the building in 1929.

In 1930s the theater became a professional summer stock house. In August 1938 Orson Welles staged a short-lived production of Too Much Johnson, an adaptation of the William Gillette farce. Motion picture sequences that were to provide exposition had to be abandoned due to the theater's lack of projection facilities, and the resulting plot confusion resulted in the production being permanently shelved. Too Much Johnson was performed August 16–29, 1938, with the cast including Joseph Cotten, Edgar Barrier, George Duthie, Ruth Ford, Guy Kingsley, Howard Smith, Virginia Welles, Mary Wickes, Richard Wilson and Eustace Wyatt.

During World War II, the building was transformed into a parachute factory. In 1960, the building returned to its theatre traditions and became The Stony Creek Puppet House. The building was closed in 2009 due to building and fire code violations, and it changed ownership in 2013.

The Legacy Theatre, after its grand opening concert, staged Neil Simon's Barefoot in the Park as the first of its 2021 calendar of live shows.

Puppet House
The Puppet House had a collection of traditional ,  Sicilian puppets used in Opera dei Pupi.  These puppets were the last few remaining of three hundred created by the acknowledged master of the field, Sebastiano Zappala, at the beginning of the 20th century. Their bodies are constructed of steel reinforced hardwood covered with hemp and canvas, with heads hand-carved out of solid walnut and painted with fine detail. Each puppet is immediately identifiable by his distinctive colorful costume, ranging from peasant garb to hand embossed brass suits of armor  with individual coats of arms worn by emperors, kings, and knights of Western Europe, to colorful flowing robes worn by Moors from North Africa.

The stories these puppets would portray are those of the ancient European poems and epics, such as Turoldus' "La Chanson de Roland", Ariosto's "Orlando Furioso", Boiardo's "Orlando Innamorato", and Tasso's "Gerusalemme Liberata",  bringing to life the glory and spirit of the Crusades, battles of knights and kings, and the struggle of heroes against villains and evil wizards. Glory, fame, justice, love and impossible dreams would be pursued by great characters of history and legend as the plots unfolded before the audience, while comic relief is provided by a traditional buffoon, who acts as a link between the audience and the ancient characters on stage. In the traditional spirit of the Commedia dell'arte, dialogue would be improvised, while sound effects such as drums, trumpets, and the sounds of battle enlivened the action. The great size and sheer presence of these puppets would make their world of history, fantasy, myth and mystery seem to come to life, while the characteristic puppet-like movements would simultaneously lend the play an air of unreality.

The puppeteers would stand six feet above the stage on a structure called "the bridge", manipulating each puppet by a rod attached to the head and torso, another rod attached to the sword hand, and a string attached to the shield hand. In addition to requiring great physical strength and dexterity, each puppeteer was required to manipulate several puppets during the play, giving each a separate personality by its physical movements and gestures.

References

External links
The Puppet House Theater official site
The Stony Creek Theater at The Legacy Theatre website

Buildings and structures in Branford, Connecticut
Tourist attractions in New Haven County, Connecticut
Puppet theaters
Theatres in Connecticut
Puppetry in the United States